Babi, also Baba, in ancient Egyptian religion, was the deification of the hamadryas baboon, one of the animals present in ancient Egypt. His name is usually translated as "bull of the baboons", roughly meaning "chief of the baboons".

Since baboons were considered to be the dead, Babi was viewed as a deity of the Underworld, the Duat. Baboons are extremely aggressive and omnivorous, and Babi was viewed as being very bloodthirsty, and living on entrails. Consequently, he was viewed as devouring the souls of the sinful after they had been weighed against Maat (the concept of truth/order), and was thus said to stand by a lake of fire, representing destruction. Since this judging of righteousness was an important part of the underworld, Babi was said to be the first-born son of Osiris, the god of the dead in the same regions in which people believed in Babi.

Baboons also have noticeably high libidos, in addition to their high level of genital marking, and so Babi was considered the god of virility of the dead. He was usually portrayed with an erection, and due to the association with the judging of souls, was sometimes depicted as using it as the mast of the ferry which conveyed the righteous to Aaru, a series of islands. One spell in a funerary text identifies the deceased person's phallus with Babi, ensuring that the deceased will be able to have sexual intercourse in the afterlife.

References

External links

Egyptian gods
Underworld gods
Animal gods
Mythological monkeys